The 2021–22 Florida Gulf Coast Eagles men's basketball team represented Florida Gulf Coast University in the 2021–22 NCAA Division I men's basketball season. The Eagles, led by fourth-year head coach Michael Fly, played their home games at Alico Arena in Fort Myers, Florida as members of the East division of the ASUN Conference. They finished the regular season 21–11, 10–6 to finish in third place in the East division in ASUN play. They defeated North Alabama in the first round of the ASUN tournament before losing to Bellarmine in the quarterfinals. They received an invite to The Basketball Classic, formerly known as the CollegeInsider.com Tournament.

On March 5, 2022, the school fired Michael Fly as head coach. On March 14, the school named former Penn State head coach Pat Chambers the team's new head coach.

Previous season 
In a season limited due to the ongoing COVID-19 pandemic, the Eagles finished the 2020–21 season 10–8, 4–5 in ASUN Play to finish in sixth place. They lost in the semifinals of the ASUN tournament to North Alabama.

Roster

Schedule and results 

|-
!colspan=9 style=| Non-conference regular season

|-
!colspan=9 style=| ASUN regular season

|-
!colspan=12 style=| ASUN tournament

|-
!colspan=12 style=| The Basketball Classic

Source

References

Florida Gulf Coast Eagles men's basketball seasons
Florida Gulf Coast
Florida Gulf Coast
Florida Gulf Coast
Florida Gulf Coast Eagles